Ayodhyapuri is a former village development committee and now a part of Madi Municipality in Chitwan District, Bagmati Province of southern Nepal. At the time of the 2011 Nepal census it had a population of 10,693 people (4,914 male; 5,779 female) living in 2,555 individual households.
The main economic activity among villagers is subsistence agriculture.

Ayodhyapuri is one of the places thought and claimed by Nepal PM Mr. Oli in 2022 to be the birthplace of the Hindu deity Rama, But there are no evidence of it, as per history and evidence the actual birth place of Rama is in Ayodhya near saryu river in UP state of India. The Department of Archeology of Nepal has started an archeological excavation to look for evidence in support of Ayodhyapuri's claim.

See also 
Ram Janmabhoomi

References

Populated places in Chitwan District
Village development committees (Nepal)
Archaeological sites in Nepal